Rocky Branch is a  long 2nd order tributary to Lanes Creek in Anson County, North Carolina.

Course
Rocky Branch rises about 1.5 miles northeast of Peachland, North Carolina.  Rocky Branch then flows southeast to meet Lanes Creek about 2.5 miles north of Peachland.

Watershed
Rocky Branch drains  of area, receives about 48.0 in/year of precipitation, has a topographic wetness index of 429.73 and is about 38% forested.

References

Rivers of North Carolina
Rivers of Anson County, North Carolina
Tributaries of the Pee Dee River